Ritchie Edhouse (born 19 April 1983) is a professional English darts player who plays in Professional Darts Corporation events. He reached the last 32 of the 2015 BDO World Trophy, and won a PDC Challenge Tour event in 2016, before gaining a PDC Tour Card in 2017.

Career
Edhouse reached the semi-finals of the 2018 Dutch Darts Championship, where he lost to Ricky Evans 5–7. He won his second Challenge Tour event in early 2019, and a third in 2020, allowing him to regain his tour card for the 2021 season.

World Championship results

PDC
 2020: Second round (lost to James Wade 0–3)
 2022: Second round (lost to Gerwyn Price 1–3)
 2023: First round (lost to David Cameron 2–3)

Performance timeline

PDC European Tour

(W) Won; (F) finalist; (SF) semifinalist; (QF) quarterfinalist; (#R) rounds 6, 5, 4, 3, 2, 1; (RR) round-robin stage; (Prel.) Preliminary round; (DNQ) Did not qualify; (DNP) Did not participate; (NH) Not held; (EX) Excluded; (WD) Withdrew

References

External links

1983 births
Living people
English darts players
People from Enfield, London
Professional Darts Corporation current tour card holders
21st-century English people